Hugh Duff is a retired Scottish lawn and indoor bowler. He was a member of the Auchinleck Indoor Bowling Club.

Duff won two world indoor singles title in 1988 and nine years later in 1997.
Duff also partnered fellow Scotsman Paul Foster when winning the 2002 World Indoor Pairs.

After losing in a preliminary match in the 2003 World Indoor Bowls Championship, Duff announced that he would retire from the sport.

References

Year of birth missing (living people)
Living people
Scottish male bowls players
Indoor Bowls World Champions